Spirit Halloween: The Movie is a 2022 American supernatural horror film directed by David Poag in his feature film directorial debut, and written by Billie Bates. Produced in partnership with the Spirit Halloween retailer, the film stars Christopher Lloyd and Rachael Leigh Cook, and follows three middle schoolers who find themselves locked in a haunted Spirit Halloween store on Halloween night. 

Spirit Halloween: The Movie was released theatrically on September 30, 2022, before being released on video-on-demand (VOD) platforms on October 11, 2022.

Plot 
In the 1940s, an evil man named Alec Windsor attempts to take down an orphanage so that he can buy the land. He gets cursed by a witch and dies, however, his spirit lived on in the physical realm. In the present day, three friends - Jake, Bo, and Carson - decide to secretly spend Halloween night in a Spirit Halloween store, not realizing it sits on the same land where Windsor was cursed.

Cast
 Donovan Colan as Jake
 Marissa Reyes as Kate, Carson's older sister.
 Jaiden J. Smith as Bo
 Dylan Frankel as Carson
 Rachael Leigh Cook as Sue, Jake's mother, and a recently remarried widow.
 Christopher Lloyd as Alec Windsor, a wealthy land developer who mysteriously disappeared one Halloween night. His spirit is said to haunt the town in which the film is set each year on Halloween for one hour.
 Marla Gibbs as Grandma G

Production

Production on Spirit Halloween: The Movie began in late 2021 and wrapped in February 2022. The film was not publicly announced until April 11, 2022, when Christopher Lloyd and Rachael Leigh Cook were confirmed to star in it. The film is produced by Strike Back Studios, Hideout Pictures, and Particular Crowd, in an official partnership with Spirit Halloween.

Noor Ahmed, president of Strike Back Studios, stated, "One of the reasons I immediately connected with the script is it is very much inspired by some of my favorite kid adventure films growing up, from The Goonies, Gremlins, Monster Squad, and so many great films made by Amblin Entertainment".

The film was shot in Rome, Georgia and Nashville, Tennessee. The film was also shot at an actual Spirit Halloween store in Rome, which was formerly occupied by Toys "R" Us.

Release

Distribution
The film debuted in theaters September 30, 2022, followed by a release on video-on-demand (VOD) on October 11, 2022.

Marketing
A trailer for the film premiered at the opening of Spirit Halloween's flagship store in Egg Harbor Township, New Jersey, on July 30, 2022. The trailer was also shown at Midsummer Scream, a Halloween- and horror-themed convention in Long Beach, California, on July 31.

Critical response
On the review aggregator website Rotten Tomatoes, the film has an approval rating of 54% based on 26 critics' reviews, with an average rating of 4.8/10. The site's consensus reads: "Neither a trick nor much of a treat, Spirit Halloween: The Movie is a decent but overall unmemorable choice for families seeking spooky season viewing options". On Metacritic, the film has a weighted average score of 48 out of 100 based on eight critics' reviews, indicating "mixed or average reviews".

Meagan Navarro of Bloody Disgusting gave the film a score of two-and-a-half out of five, writing that it "serves as an effective showcase of the store's catalog", but "never fully utilizes its store setting to its advantage, though. The feature opts to spotlight only a handful of items in what amounts to an endless chase between the boys and a ghostly villain instead of using the setup to build an atmosphere or a haunted funhouse feel." Navarro concluded that, "it's not the story or its characters that linger in mind once those end credits hit; it's the items that'll fill up your Spirit Halloween wish lists." Jordan Hoffman of The A.V. Club gave the film a grade of "C–", likening the experience of watching it to the experience of visiting a Spirit Halloween store: "Most of the stuff in there is, let's face it, mass-produced crap. [...] It's all smiles going in, which turns quickly to boredom, before an unsatisfied exit." Hoffman called the film "harmless and less than 80 minutes if you turn it off before the credits are done. It's just so embarrassingly thin. The few chuckles are all the more depressing when you realize that this could have been a winner with a clever screenwriter and a competent director."

References

Further reading

External links
 

2022 directorial debut films
2022 independent films
2022 horror films
2020s supernatural films
American films about Halloween
American supernatural horror films
American independent films
Films about children
Sponsored films
Halloween adventure films